Peculiar Situation is a smooth jazz studio album by Earl Klugh released in 1999. This release features Klugh on both guitar and keyboard, and contains Klugh's first ever vocal track, as he "takes the role of a sideman to a vocalist for the first time in his recording career, breezing in behind Roberta Flack on 'Now and Again'".

Background
Klugh's first and only album for Windham Hill Jazz (01934 11383 2), his 20th studio album overall, finds him for the most part mining familiar and friendly territory. The exceptions being the aforementioned vocal track with Roberta Flack and the Caribbean flavored "Desert Paradise", with The Ambassadors providing backing vocals. The usual reliable crew of backing musicians is present, Al Turner, Lenny Price and Greg Phillinganes. The track "Before You Go" was used in the television series "Melrose Place". After this release, Klugh took six years off from studio recording to concentrate on world tours, including an American Goodwill tour sponsored by U.S. State Department.

Track listing 
All songs composed by Earl Klugh except where noted.
"Peculiar Situation" – 4:22
"Now and Again" (Klugh, Gary Brown) – 4:35
"Private Affair" – 4:30
"Thin Ice" – 4:37
"I'm Falling" – 4:33
"Romantic Intent" – 5:20
"Desert Paradise" – 4:45
"Forever Girl" – 5:23
"Before You Go" – 4:51
"Southern Dog" – 4:34
"When I Look at You" – 4:43

Personnel

Musicians
 Earl Klugh – acoustic guitar, keyboards
 Al Turner – bass, drums, percussion
 Lenny Price – saxophone
 Roberta Flack – vocals (track 2)
 Greg Phillinganes – electric piano (track 2)
 Rick Williams – rhythm guitar (track 2)
 Donnie Lyle – rhythm guitar (track 10)
 Tommie Walker – synthesizer bass (track 11)
 Adegboyega Adeniji, Gary Brown, James Agwu, Ayite Milomfa, Cindy Mizell, The Ambassadors (track 7) – backing vocals

Technical
 Earl Klugh – producer
 Howie Lindeman – engineer
 Eric Morgeson – engineer
 Andrew Felluss – assistant engineer
 Todd Fairall – assistant engineer
 Jason Stasium – assistant engineer
 Gerard Smerek – mixing engineer

Charts

References 

1999 albums
Earl Klugh albums
Windham Hill Records albums